Steve Sutton was a Canadian skydiver who began the sport in 1965 at the age of nineteen. He was born on May 29, 1946 and died on May 27, 2020.

On July 3, 1969, Sutton set a then-world record by making  200 jumps in a 24-hour period.

He was a member of Canada's National Parachute Team from 1970 to 1972, competing in two World Championships, and winning the Silver Medal in Men's Individual Accuracy at the XI World Parachuting Championships in the United States in 1972.

As part of his skydiving career, Sutton also researched improvements in parachute design in the 1970s.  These endeavors led Sutton to design the FlowForm kite, a kite based roughly on the idea of the ram air parachute but also self-regulating and adapting to significant changes in wind conditions.  He was married to Kathy Sutton, herself a Gold Medalist in Women's Individual Accuracy at the XV World Parachuting Championships in Bulgaria in 1980.

References

External links 
 CSPA Canadian Records - Describing his 200 jumps in a 24-hour period in 1969.
 Canadian Medal Winners at Past WPC's - Silver Medal at the XI World Parachuting Championships and other achievements.
 Our Flight to Florida, Christmas 2002 - Trip to Florida from Toronto in Fluffy, a Cessna 150, in December 2002-January 2003.
 Development of the FlowForm kite - Research into new parachute designs and how it led him to develop the FlowForm kite.

Canadian skydivers
Living people
Year of birth missing (living people)
Place of birth missing (living people)